The meridian 20° east of Greenwich is a line of longitude that extends from the North Pole across the Arctic Ocean, Europe, Africa, the Atlantic and Indian oceans, the Southern Ocean, and Antarctica to the South Pole.

The 20th meridian east forms a great circle with the 160th meridian west.

Part of Namibia's borders with Botswana and South Africa are defined by the meridian. The boundary between the Atlantic Ocean and the Indian Ocean is defined by the meridian. The meridian defines the eastern limit of the New Swabia area in Queen Maud Land, Antarctica.

From Pole to Pole
Starting at the North Pole and heading south to the South Pole, the 20th meridian east passes through:

{| class="wikitable plainrowheaders"
! scope="col" width="125" | Co-ordinates
! scope="col" | Country, territory or sea
! scope="col" | Notes
|-
| style="background:#b0e0e6;" | 
! scope="row" style="background:#b0e0e6;" | Arctic Ocean
| style="background:#b0e0e6;" |
|-
| 
! scope="row" | 
| Islands of Nordaustlandet and Spitsbergen, Svalbard
|-
| style="background:#b0e0e6;" | 
! scope="row" style="background:#b0e0e6;" | Barents Sea
| style="background:#b0e0e6;" |
|-
| style="background:#b0e0e6;" | 
! scope="row" style="background:#b0e0e6;" | Atlantic Ocean
| style="background:#b0e0e6;" | Norwegian Sea
|-
| 
! scope="row" | 
| Island of Vanna, and the mainland
|-
| 
! scope="row" | 
| For about 2 km
|-
| 
! scope="row" | 
| For about 18 km
|-
| 
! scope="row" | 
|
|-
| style="background:#b0e0e6;" | 
! scope="row" style="background:#b0e0e6;" | Baltic Sea
| style="background:#b0e0e6;" | Gulf of Bothnia
|-
| 
! scope="row" | 
| Island of Fasta Åland
|-
| style="background:#b0e0e6;" | 
! scope="row" style="background:#b0e0e6;" | Baltic Sea
| style="background:#b0e0e6;" |
|-
| 
! scope="row" | 
| Kaliningrad Oblast (exclave)
|-
| 
! scope="row" | 
| Passing through  Kraków (where crosses with 50th parallel north)
|-
| 
! scope="row" | 
| Passing through the mountain of Kriváň
|-
| 
! scope="row" | 
| Passing just west of Szeged
|-
| 
! scope="row" | 
|
|-
| 
! scope="row" | 
|
|-
| 
! scope="row" | 
|
|-
| style="background:#b0e0e6;" | 
! scope="row" style="background:#b0e0e6;" | Mediterranean Sea
| style="background:#b0e0e6;" | Ionian Sea
|-
| 
! scope="row" | 
| Island of Corfu
|-
| style="background:#b0e0e6;" | 
! scope="row" style="background:#b0e0e6;" | Mediterranean Sea
| style="background:#b0e0e6;" | Ionian Sea and the Mediterranean proper
|-
| 
! scope="row" | 
|
|-
| style="background:#b0e0e6;" | 
! scope="row" style="background:#b0e0e6;" | Mediterranean Sea
| style="background:#b0e0e6;" | Gulf of Sidra
|-
| 
! scope="row" | 
|
|-
| 
! scope="row" | 
|
|-
| 
! scope="row" | 
|
|-
| 
! scope="row" | 
|
|-
| 
! scope="row" | 
|
|-
| 
! scope="row" | 
|
|-
| 
! scope="row" |  /  border
|
|-
| 
! scope="row" |  /  (Northern Cape) border
|
|-valign="top"
| 
! scope="row" | 
| Northern Cape Western Cape
|-
| style="background:#b0e0e6;" | 
! scope="row" style="background:#b0e0e6;" | Atlantic Ocean / Indian Ocean boundary
| style="background:#b0e0e6;" |
|-
| style="background:#b0e0e6;" | 
! scope="row" style="background:#b0e0e6;" | Southern Ocean
| style="background:#b0e0e6;" |
|-
| 
! scope="row" | Antarctica
| Queen Maud Land, claimed by 
|-
|}

See also
19th meridian east
21st meridian east

References 

e020th meridian east
Namibia–South Africa border
Botswana–Namibia border